Doronicum corsicum is a species of the genus Doronicum and the family Asteraceae. some authors have regarded the species as belonging to either Arnica or Aronicum. It is a rare plant that has been found only on the Island of Corsica in the Mediterranean (part of the French Republic).

References

External links
Czech Botany, Doronicum corsicum (Loisel.) Poir. – kamzičník in Czech with photos

Senecioneae
Endemic flora of France
Flora of Corsica
Plants described in 1807